

Abu Dhabi

Central Region

|}

Eastern Region

|}

Western Region

|}

Ajman

|}

Dubai

|}

|}

|}

Fujairah

|}

Ra's al-Khaimah

|}

Sharjah

Heart of Sharjah

|}

Umm al-Quwain

|}

See also
 List of Ancient Settlements in the UAE

References

Cultural property